Příběh kmotra (English: Story of a Godfather) is a Czech thriller film made in 2013. It was directed by Petr Nikolaev. It is based on story of Czech Mobster František Mrázek.

The film was visited in Czech cinema by 295 683 people which makes it the second most visited Czech film of 2013 and the fourth most visited film in Czech cinema of 2013.

Development
The filming started on Saturday 25 November 2011 in Voděradské bučiny. The first shot was of a film murder. It was planned that shooting of the film would take 40 days. It was finished in June 2013.

The main character was to be played by Marko Igonda but in the end he was replaced by Ondřej Vetchý.

The film is inspired by French noir films. It is about the confrontation of a mobster, Vedral, and a policeman, Cajthaml.

Plot 
The story follows František Vedral who is growing up in Communist Czechoslovakia. He has talent for business and loves football. Through football he finds friends in Standa Tipl and Josef Strnad. Strnad later becomes a high rank police officer while Vedral with Tipl starts with illegal business. Vedral becomes very ruthless and even demolishes a local Jewish cemetery to make money. He catches the attention of the young policeman Cajthaml who wants to arrest him. Vedral starts to smuggle electronics from the West and pays by stolen goods. Cajthaml finds his warehouse surrounded by police and Vedral is saved by Strnad. Vedral and his accomplices are arrested soon after as the police finds illegal materials and goods in his flat but Vedral is released on parole. Cajthaml promises him that he will be after him.

Fall of regime gives Vedral new opportunities. His accomplice including Tipl are released thank to Amnesty. He gives Civic Forum one million Czechoslovak crowns and gains influence on some politicians. Thank to Voucher privatization he gets property and his influence grows. He is watched by Cajthaml who is awaiting an opportunity to catch Vedral and his gang. He along with his colleague Ota set up trap on Vedral and prepare to arrest him but Ota is found dead. It is classified as a suicide. Shocked Cajthaml finds out that Strnad became a director of National Security Authority. Vedral then ordered a murder of a journalist who was making troubles.

Cajthaml finds an ally in a Prosecutor who is not afraid of Vedral who at the time planned to get Sezeta company which would make him the most powerful person in country. Cajthaml tries to spoil his plans but the prosecutor is found dead and Cajthaml is forced to leave police. As a revenge he drains a false information between Vedral, Tipl and Strnad and they start to be suspicious against themselves. At the time it becomes an interest of Czech Security Agency to get rid of Vedral from Sezeta. Vedral is killed by an unknown sniper.

Cast and characters 
Ondřej Vetchý – František Vedral – He is the main protagonist and a minor criminal who becomes an influential mob boss. He is ruthless and has influence on politicians and entrepreneurs. He is inspired by František Mrázek.
Lukáš Vaculík – Čestmír Cajthaml – A lawful police investigator who serves as the main antagonist of the film. He tries to convict Vedral of his crimes.
Jan Vondráček – Standa Tipl – A mobster and a crime partner of Vedral. Inspired by Tomáš Pitr.
Vica Kerekes – Zuzana – A journalist and a love interest of Vedral. She later helps Cajthaml.
Kryštof Hádek – Rotný Bohoušek – A young policeman who works with Cajthaml and supports him when he loses hope.
Jiří Dvořák – Josef Strnad – A mobster and a friend of Vedral who works at police.
Zuzana Čapková – Blanka Vedralova – A wife of Vedral.
Andrej Hryc – Farkaš – A sadistic gangster who works for Vedral.

Trivia
On 10 September 2013 the family of František Mrázek sued the filmmakers.

Reception
The film was well received by critics and audiences as well.
 František Fuka, FFFilm 21 October 2013 70/

References

External links 
 

2013 films
2013 crime thriller films
Films based on biographies
Films about organized crime in the Czech Republic
Czech biographical films
Czech crime thriller films
Czech political films
Czech gangster films
Czech films based on actual events